Hugo Achugar (born 1944 in Montevideo) is a professor emeritus at the University of Miami and a Uruguayan poet, essayist, and researcher.

Biography
Achugar graduated from the Artigas Institute for Teachers (Instituto de Profesores Artigas) with a degree in literature and taught secondary education in Uruguay until he was dismissed by the Uruguayan dictatorship. He then relocated to Caracas, where he worked as a researcher for the Rómulo Gallegos Center for Latin American Studies.

He has held professorships in Venezuela, the United States, and Uruguay. He currently teaches cultural policies at University of the Republic in Uruguay.

Publications

Poetry
 El derrumbe (1968)
 Con bigote triste (1971)
 Mi país / mi casa (1973)
 Textos para decir María (1976)
 Seis mariposas tropicales (1986)
 Las mariposas tropicales (1987)
 Todo lo que es sólido se disuelve en el aire (1989)
 Orfeo en el salón de la memoria (1991)
 El cuerpo del Bautista (1996)
 Hueso quevrado (2006)
 "Incorrección" (2012)
 "Los pasados del presente" (2016)
 "Demoliciones" (2019)

Criticism
 Ideologías y estructuras narratives en José Donoso (1950-1970) (1979)
 Poesía y sociedad (Uruguay, 1880-1911) (1986)
 La balsa de la Medusa (1992)
 La biblioteca en ruinas: reflexiones culturales desde la periferia (1994)
 Planetas sin boca.Escritos efímeros sobre arte, cultura, y literature (2004)
 "Piedra, papel o tijera. Sobre cultura y literatura en América Latina". (2020)

Narrative
  Cañas de la India (1995) (Con el heterónimo Juana Caballero)
 Falsas memorias: Blanca Luz Brum (2000)

Discourses of the Self
 Habla el Huérfano (2019)

References

External links
Hugo Achugar at University of Miami website 

1944 births
Living people
Latin Americanists
Uruguayan literary critics
University of Miami faculty
20th-century Uruguayan poets
Uruguayan male poets
21st-century Uruguayan poets
21st-century Uruguayan male writers
20th-century Uruguayan male writers
Premio Bartolomé Hidalgo